Emily Pinto (born ), also called Emily Pablito, was an American painter from the Zuni Pueblo tribe. Her artwork depicted Zuni culture including Kachina figures and representations of traditional Zuni jars. Some of her drawings and paintings are in the permanent collection of the Smithsonian National Museum of the American Indian.

External links 

 Emily Pinto artworks at the National Museum of the American Indian

References 

20th-century American painters
20th-century indigenous painters of the Americas
Native American painters
Pueblo artists
20th-century American women artists
19th-century indigenous painters of the Americas
Painters from New Mexico
Zuni people
Year of birth uncertain